The Laugh-O-Gram Studio (also called Laugh-O-Gram Studios) was a short-lived film studio located on the second floor of the McConahay Building at 1127 East 31st in Kansas City, Missouri that operated from June 28, 1921 to November 20, 1923.

In the early years of animation, the studio was home to many of the pioneers of animation, brought there by Walt Disney. It was the site of inspiration for Disney and Ub Iwerks to create Mickey Mouse. Laugh-O-Gram is the subject of two feature films: As Dreamers Do and Walt Before Mickey.

History
In 1921, Walt Disney was contracted by Milton Feld to animate twelve cartoons, which he called Newman's Laugh-O-grams. On May 23, 1922, when Disney was 20 years old, Laugh-O-gram Films (LOGF) was incorporated by him using the remaining assets of the defunct Iwerks-Disney Commercial Artists from local investors. LOGF produced nine of the requested 12 films with little income. But encouraged by his shorts' popularity at the theatre, and inspired by, Disney decided he wanted to make his own animated versions of fairy tales too, and invested six months on his first attempt at Little Red Riding Hood.

Among Disney's employees on the series were several pioneers of animation: Ub Iwerks, Hugh Harman, Friz Freleng, and Carman Maxwell. The company had financial problems and by the end of 1922, Disney was living in the office and taking baths once a week at Union Station.

During the studio's sales manager Leslie Mace's stay in New York, where he was looking for distributors, he ended up signing a contract for six animated shorts with Pictorial Clubs, Inc. of Tennessee on Sunday, September 16, 1922. Pictorial agreed to pay  for the cartoons, which were supposed to be shown at schools and other non-theatrical places, but only paid $100 in advance. The rest of the payment would have to wait until January 1, 1924, when all the shorts had been delivered. When Pictorial went bankrupt only a few months later, the studio never received the rest of the payment, its financial problems became even more serious, and the staff ended up leaving. But when the local Kansas City dentist Thomas B. McCrum, from the Deener Dental Institute, contacted Disney and offered him the job of producing a short subject about dental hygiene intended for the Missouri school system, he brought together some of his staff again and made Tommy Tucker's Tooth, which earned the studio $500. Instead of paying off his creditors, the money was invested in the live-action/animation demonstration film Alice's Wonderland, starring the youthful Virginia Davis. Disney had noted how popular the Out of the Inkwell series from the Fleischer Studios was, which had animated characters interacting with the real world. By reversing this gimmick and using a real-life character in a cartoon universe instead, he hoped for a hit.
Virginia Davis's contract with Laugh-O-gram was signed by her parents on April 23, 1923, with terms giving her 5% of the Alice's Wonderland film's receipts. Looking for a distributor for Alice's Wonderland on May 14, Disney wrote to Margaret Winkler, a New York film distributor.

After finishing the raw edits of Alice's Wonderland, the studio filed for Chapter 11 bankruptcy in July 1923. Disney finally made some money by shooting a film of a 6-month-old girl named Kathalee Viley and selling his movie camera, earning enough for a one-way train ticket, moving to Hollywood, California; he brought along an unfinished reel of Alice's Wonderland.

The bankruptcy trustee was able to force LOGF's erstwhile distributor and debtor, Pictorial Films, Inc., to pay LOGF's agents the sum owed while agreeing that Pictorial could exercise its contractual distribution rights for LOGF works and to purchase several of LOGF's films: The Four Musicians of Bremen, Jack the Giant Killer, the Lafflets series, and Alice's Wonderland.

The studio building fell to ruin and efforts were made to restore it by a non-profit group called "Thank You, Walt Disney". The Disney family promised $450,000 in matching funds for the rit other Disney memorabilia and to tell the history of Walt Disney's life in Kansas City, a movie house to exhibit original and restored Laugh-O-grams, and an education center to tell people and children about animation and to make their own animations inside the building.

On July 30, 2021, a black Dodge Charger struck the building and caused significant damage to the exterior. The incident occurred early in the morning, the driver fleeing the scene, though authorities subsequently found a woman's driving license and a margarita within the vehicle. Butch Rigby, who launched the campaign to save and restore the building, described the incident optimistically, "The bottom line, it’s a bump in the road, but it could have been worse."

Inspiration for Mickey Mouse

Disney told interviewers that the inspiration to draw Mickey came from a tame mouse at his desk at Laugh-O-Gram Studio in Kansas City, Missouri.

In 1928 during a train trip to New York, he showed the drawing to his wife Lillian Marie Bounds and said he was going to call it "Mortimer Mouse". She replied that the name sounded "too pompous" and suggested Mickey Mouse instead.

Filmography
Of the original seven Laugh-O-grams fairy tales, four were long known to have survived, and have been restored for DVD: Little Red Riding Hood (1922), The Four Musicians of Bremen (1922), Puss in Boots (1922), and Cinderella (1922). These shorts later became available on Blu-ray Disc as bonus features for Disney's Beauty and the Beast. Tommy Tucker's Tooth (1922) and Alice's Wonderland (1923) are also available on DVD, and Alice's Wonderland eventually became a bonus feature for the 60th Anniversary Blu-ray Edition of Alice in Wonderland. The original piece of filming and animation known as Newman Laugh-O-grams (originally released theatrically on March 20, 1921) is available on some DVDs too. Due to their date of publication, all 11 shorts produced by the studio have defaulted into the public domain.

The missing fairy tale cartoons were Jack and the Beanstalk, Jack the Giant Killer, and Goldie Locks and the Three Bears (all 1922). On October 14, 2010, animation historian David Gerstein announced that copies of all three had been found. For many years the two Jack cartoons were believed to be one, until researcher John Kenworthy located old studio assets sheets confirming that they were separate shorts.

See also
 List of points of interest in Kansas City, Missouri
 Walt Disney Hometown Museum, located in his hometown of Marceline, Missouri
 List of Disney animated films based on fairy tales
 Studio system

References

External links

 thankyouwaltdisney.org Thank you Walt Disney - Restoring Laugh-O-Gram Studios
 Fairy Tale Flappers: Animated Adaptations of Little Red and Cinderella (1922-1925)

American companies established in 1921
American companies disestablished in 1923
 
Mass media companies established in 1921
1921 establishments in Missouri
1923 disestablishments in Missouri
Mass media companies disestablished in 1923
American animation studios
Walt Disney
History of animation
History of The Walt Disney Company
Defunct American film studios
Companies that filed for Chapter 11 bankruptcy in 1923
History of Kansas City, Missouri
Companies based in Kansas City, Missouri
Buildings and structures in Kansas City, Missouri
Walt Disney Animation Studios
The Walt Disney Company
Articles containing video clips